Democracy: The God That Failed is a 2001 book by Hans-Hermann Hoppe, containing a series of thirteen essays on the subject of democracy.  The book "examines modern democracies in the light of various evident failures" which, in Hoppe's view, include rising unemployment rates, expanding public debt, and insolvent social security systems.  He attributes democracy's failures to pressure groups seeking increased government expenditures, regulations and taxation and a lack of counter-measures to them. Potential solutions he discusses include secession, "shifting of control over the nationalised wealth from a larger, central government to a smaller, regional one" and "complete freedom of contract, occupation, trade and migration introduced". Hoppe concludes that democracy is the primary cause of a wave of decivilization sweeping the world since World War I, and that democracy must be delegitimized.

Hoppe characterizes democracy as "publicly owned government", and when he compares it with monarchy—"privately owned government"—he concludes that the latter is preferable; however, Hoppe aims to show that both monarchy and democracy are deficient systems compared to his preferred structure for advancing civilization—something he calls the natural order, a system free of both taxation and coercive monopoly in which jurisdictions freely compete for adherents. In his Introduction, he lists other names used elsewhere to refer to this concept of "natural order", including "ordered anarchy", "private property anarchism", "anarcho-capitalism", "autogovernment", "private law society", and "pure capitalism".

The title of the work is an allusion to The God that Failed, a 1949 work in which six authors who formerly held communist views describe their experience of and subsequent disillusion with communism.

Reception

Walter Block, a colleague of Hoppe's at the Mises Institute, reviewed the book in The American Journal of Economics and Sociology and gave it a generally favorable review. He concludes, "This book will take by storm the field of political economy, and no one interested in these topics can afford to be without it."

Publishing history

English
 Transaction Publishers [New Brunswick, NJ] (2001)
 Hardcover. .
 Paperback. .
 Routledge (2017)
 Audiobook edition.
 Narrated by Paul Strikwerda.
 Audio at Mises Institute
 Online at SoundCloud

German: Demokratie: Der Gott, der keiner ist.
 Manuscriptum [Leipzig, Germany]
 Afterword by Lorenz Jäger.
 Hardcover. .
 Preface. (Vorwort zur deutschen Ausgabe).

Italian: Democrazia: il dio che ha fallito.
 Cloth. .

Korean
 Korean Center for Free Enterprise
 Hardcover. .
 Paperback. .

Spanish: Monarquia, Democracia y Orden Natural: Una Vision Austriaca de la era Americana.
 Ludwig von Mises Institute
 Translated by Prof. Jeronimo Molina.
 Presented by Jesús Huerta de Soto.
 Foreword by Jerónimo Malina.
 Cloth. .

Polish: Demokracja: bóg, który zawiódł.
 Fijorr [Warsaw, Poland] (January 2006)
 Paperback. .

Portuguese: Democracia: O Deus que Falhou.
 Instituto Ludwig von Mises Brasil [São Paulo, Brazil] (2014)
 
 Full text and preface available.

References

External links
Introduction to Democracy: The God That Failed
World War I as the End of Civilization, (MP3 file) a lecture by Hoppe on the same subject.
"Democracy: The God That Failed", an essay of the same title, also by Hoppe
English preface to the Polish edition (in PDF format)
An extract of Chapter Nine, "The Rise and Fall of the City"
Link to list of reviews of the 2001 edition

2001 books
Books about democracy
Books by Hans-Hermann Hoppe
Books in political philosophy
Transaction Publishers books